The  Washington Redskins season was the franchise's 39th season in the National Football League (NFL) and their 34th in Washington, D.C.  Second-year head coach Vince Lombardi was diagnosed with terminal cancer in late June and died on September 3; offensive line coach Bill Austin stepped in as interim head coach in mid-July.

Austin had been an NFL head coach for three seasons with the Pittsburgh Steelers (1966–68) and was starting his eighth year as an assistant coach under Lombardi (1959–64, 1969–70). Also, Austin's final four seasons as a player on the offensive line with the New York Giants (1954–57) were with Lombardi as offensive coordinator.

The Redskins finished at 6–8 in 1970, fourth in the NFC East, but with a five-game losing streak in the second half of the season. The last loss was a 34–0 shutout at rival Dallas on December 6, and Washington fell to a 4–8 record and four games behind the Cowboys.

It was the 25th consecutive season that the Redskins did not advance to the playoffs. Austin's contract was not renewed, and he was succeeded by George Allen in January 1971. Austin returned to Redskins in 1973 as the offensive line coach under Allen for five seasons.

Offseason

NFL Draft

Roster

Regular season

Schedule

Standings

Awards, records, and honors

References

Washington
Washington Redskins seasons
Washing